Saint Thomas Christian crosses are ancient crosses associated with the community of Indian subcontinent, who trace their origins to the evangelism of Thomas the Apostle in the 1st century AD. The Saint Thomas Christians, which is one of the oldest Christian communities of the world, survive in the Malabar region in state of Kerala, India and have a diaspora in other parts of the Indian subcontinent. Saint Thomas Christian crosses are known as Mar Thoma Sleeva (Saint Thomas cross), Indian cross, or Persian Cross in English, as well as Nasrani Sthambam in Malabarese.

Mar Thoma Sleeva are found at Kadamattom, Muttuchira, Kothanalloor, Kottayam, Pallippuram and Alangad in the South Indian state of Kerala. Saint Thomas Christian Crosses have been also found in other parts of the Indian subcontinent, such as Agacaim (Goa), St Thomas Mount (Tamil Nadu), Anuradhapura (Ceylon), Taxila (Pakistan), and in Baltistan. Floriated Indian crosses are found at Kottakkavu, Pallipuram and Niranam. The large open-air rock crosses known as Nasrani Sthambams are found on the facades of many Thomasine Churches. It is recorded that before the arrival of Portuguese explorers there were more than 150 Syriac churches in Malabar/Kerala.

Mar Thoma Slīva
Mar Thoma Sleeva is a Syriac term which means Saint Thomas cross. Antonio Gouvea, in the sixteenth century work Jornada, states that the old churches of Saint Thomas Christians were full of crosses of the type discovered at S. Thome (Mylapore). He also states that veneration of the cross is an old custom in Malabar. Jornada is the oldest known written document which names the cross cross from (of) Sam Thome (Mylapore". The original phrase used is Cruz de Sam Thome, meaning Cross of (from) St Thomas. For this reason, it can also mean the "Cross from Sam Thome (Mylapore = Sam Thomé: the name given by the Portuguese to the city of Mylapore).   Gouvea writes about the veneration of the Cross at Cranganore mentioning it as Cross of Christians.

Locations of Mar Thoma Sleeva

Other similar crosses:

 Taxila, Pakistan. It is a very small cross that found in a field near the ancient city Sirkap near Taxila. The cross is kept at the Cathedral Church of the Resurrection, Lahore. However, experts point out that the cross shares only one characteristic with other St Thomas crosses that they are mostly equilateral, with arms of equal length. They claim that the Christian antiquity of this cross cannot be conclusively proven, as the same characteristic is also observed in pre-Christian Buddhist crosses and Swastika-variants found in the region, and even in the Greek crosses.
 An Indian cross is depicted on the rock-piece at the front of the Parur (North) church, first published in the St Thomas Christian Encyclopaedia of India'', Vol.II, 1973, Ed. George Menachery.
 There is a St Thomas cross in stone on the porch of the Church of St Thomas the Apostle, Killinghall, carved by Charles Mawer of Leeds.

Interpretation of the inscriptions
Arthur Coke Burnell, archeologist, in 1873, translated the inscriptions as follows:
"In punishment by the cross (was) the suffering of this one;
He who is the true christ, and God above and Guide ever pure."

Prof. F. C. Burkitt and C. P. T. Winckworth, the then reader of Assyriology in the University of Cambridge studied the inscriptions and produced a translation. This has been discussed at the International Congress of Orientalists held at Oxford in 1925.

The interpretation is as follows:

"My Lord Christ, have mercy upon Afras son of Chaharbukht the Syrian, who cut this (or, who caused this to be cut)."
On the large cross, there is this additional sentence in Estrangelo Syriac. (Galatians 6:14)
"May I never boast except in the cross of our Lord Jesus Christ."

The inscription at Kadamattom church when translated is,

"I, the beautiful bird of Nineveh has come to this land. Written by me Shapper, who was saved by the Holy Messiah from misery."

Symbolism of Mar Thoma Sleeva
Unlike crosses in other traditions, the St Thomas cross does not carry the effigy of the Christ.  In addition to this unique quality, each of its elements carry symbolic meanings.  Generally the Cross symbolizes life rather than death and suffering.
Lacking the effigy of Jesus, the St Thomas cross presages the discovery of the empty tomb, glorifying the Resurrection of Jesus. 
The four edges of the cross are floral in shape, symbolizing fruition and life from the tree of life.
The lotus flower beneath the cross is a symbol of Buddhism and India. A cultural adaptation of local imagery, the cross fixed on the lotus would symbolize Christianity in India in the first century. The lotus is also a Puranic holy flower, an offering to God in the Hindu tradition; anything offered on the leaves of lotus is considered to be auspicious.
The three steps below the Cross represent Golgotha, symbolically referring to the death of Jesus, also the three decks of the Ark and the ascent to Mt. Sinai.
Finally, the dove above the cross represents the Holy Spirit, the third person of the Holy Trinity according to the Christian tradition. It is this spirit that raised Jesus from the dead and bestows gifts upon the Church's faithful.

Persian Cross

Kottakkavu Mar Thoma Syro-Malabar Pilgrim Church, North Paravur and St Mary's Syro-Malabar Forane Church, Pallipuram under the Major Archeparchy of Ernakulam-Ankamaly of the Syro Malabar Church and St Mary’s Orthodox Syrian Church, Niranam under the Niranam diocese of the Malankara Orthodox Syrian Church have the ancient, floriated Persian Cross.

Nasrani Sthambam
Nasrani Sthambams are giant open-air stone crosses. The plinths of these crosses represent lotus petals and lotus flowers, and they have square bases. They have various iconographic motifs, including elephants, peacocks and other animals. These crosses are found in Puthenchira, Parappukkara, Veliyanad, Kalpparambu, Angamaly, Kanjoor, Malayattoor, Udayamperoor, Kuravilangad, Uzhavoor, Chungam, Kaduthuruthy, Muthalakodam, Muttuchira, Kudamaloor, Niranam, Arakuzha, Kothamangalam, Chengannur, Thumpamon, Chathannur and many other places.

See also
 Nestorian cross

References

External links

 
 
 
 
 
 

Buddhism and Christianity
Saint Thomas Christians
India
India
Indian sculpture
Monuments and memorials in India
Christian crosses
Mar Thoma Syrian Church
Salvation in Catholicism